The  is a nuclear power facility under construction in Ōma, Aomori, Japan. 
It will be operated by the Electric Power Development Company (J-Power). 
The reactor would be unique for Japan in that it would be capable of using a 100% MOX fuel core, as requested by the 1995 decision by the Japanese Atomic Energy Commission. 
The fuel would utilize surplus plutonium by blending it with natural uranium, reducing the total radioactivity of nuclear waste and dramatically reducing the waste's lifetime.

In 2008, J-Power announced a 2.5-year delay to allow for additional work to make the plant resistant to a strong earthquake, making the operation start date in November 2014.
Following the Fukushima Daiichi nuclear disaster of March 2011 construction at Oma was suspended for 18 months. 
Work was resumed in October 2012. 
In March 2013, the main reactor building was at its full height.

In December 2014 J-Power applied for safety checks at the Oma nuclear plant, slated for startup in 2021.

In September 2016, the commissioning date was postponed again, this time to late 2023 or early 2024. In September 2018, the startup was postponed until 2026 to allow for expanded screening.

References

2010 establishments in Japan
Buildings and structures in Aomori Prefecture
Nuclear power stations using advanced boiling water reactors
Nuclear power stations in Japan
Nuclear power stations with reactors under construction
2014 establishments in Japan
Ōma